Vitalie Damașcan (born 24 January 1999) is a Moldovan professional footballer who plays as a forward for Liga I club FC Voluntari, on loan from Sepsi OSK, and the Moldova national team.

Club career
Damașcan made his professional debut with Zimbru Chișinău on 29 November 2015 in a league match against Milsami Orhei.

In 2017, Damașcan moved to rivals Sheriff Tiraspol on a free transfer. He scored his first goal for Sheriff against his former club Zimbru Chișinău on 7 April. The match ended in 1–0 victory for Sheriff. On 25 May, Damașcan scored a brace in the final of the 2016–17 Moldovan Cup against Zaria Bălți. Sheriff ended up lifting the trophy as they won the game 5–0.

On 16 July 2018, he was announced as a new signing by Italian club Torino.

International career
On 27 January 2018, Damașcan made his international debut for Moldova. He played 77 minutes in a 0–1 friendly defeat to South Korea before being replaced.

On 13 June 2017, Damașcan scored his first two goals for Moldova's U21 team against San Marino in 2019 European U21 Qualifiers.

International stats
'

International goals
Scores and results list Moldova's goal tally first.

Personal life
Damașcan is the younger brother of his former Zimbru Chișinău teammate Ilie.

Honours

Club
Sheriff Tiraspol
Divizia Națională: 2016–17, 2017
Moldovan Cup: 2016–17

Sepsi OSK 
Cupa României: 2021–22
Supercupa României: 2022

Individual
Divizia Națională top scorer: 2017 (13 goals)

References

External links

Notes

Living people
1999 births
People from Soroca
Moldovan people of Romanian descent
Association football forwards
Moldovan footballers
Moldova international footballers
FC Zimbru Chișinău players
FC Sheriff Tiraspol players
Torino F.C. players
Fortuna Sittard players
RKC Waalwijk players
Moldovan Super Liga players
Serie A players
Eredivisie players
Liga I players
Sepsi OSK Sfântu Gheorghe players
FC Voluntari players
Moldovan expatriate footballers
Expatriate footballers in Italy
Moldovan expatriate sportspeople in Italy
Expatriate footballers in the Netherlands
Moldovan expatriate sportspeople in the Netherlands